Live at the Floating Jazz Festival is a live album by jazz violinist Johnny Frigo.

Track listing 
My Romance (5:35)     
Porgy and Bess Medley (8:16)     
My Favorite Things (4:17)     
There Will Never Be Another You (4:42)     
Detour Ahead (5:43)     
Man I Love/Iv'e Got a Crush on You/Liza/Strike Up the Band (8:16)     
My Foolish Heart (5:46)     
It Might as Well Be Spring (9:04)     
This Can't Be Love (5:16)     
Isn't It Romantic (6:05)     
Lester Leaps In (5:00)

Personnel
 Joe Vito – piano
 Johnny Frigo – violin
 Rob Thomas – violin
 Terry Gibbs – vibraphone
 Larry Gray – double bass
 Rick Frigo – drums

References

Johnny Frigo albums
1999 live albums
Live swing albums
Arbors Records live albums